This is a list of pirate films and TV series, primarily in the pirate film genre, about the Golden Age of Piracy from the 17th through 18th centuries. The list includes films about other periods of piracy, TV series, and films tangentially related, such as pirate-themed pornographic films. Films about other types of piracy, such as music piracy, are not included.

Films

1900s

1910s

1920s

1930s

1940s

1950s

1960s

1970s

1980s

1990s

2000s

2010s

2020s

Television series

Pirate film series

References

External links

Lists of films by genre
Lists of crime films
Lists of television series by genre